State Road 500 (NM 500) is a  state highway in the US state of New Mexico. NM 500's western terminus is at NM 45 in Albuquerque, and the eastern terminus is at Interstate 25 (I-25) and U.S. Route 85 (US 85) in Albuquerque. From I-25, NM 500 continues east as Rio Bravo Boulevard to University Boulevard.

Route description

History

Major intersections

See also

References

External links

0500
Transportation in Bernalillo County, New Mexico